Germán Pacheco Díaz (born 16 March 1968) is a Mexican politician affiliated with the PAN. He currently serves as Deputy of the LXII Legislature of the Mexican Congress representing Tamaulipas.

References

1968 births
Living people
People from Tampico, Tamaulipas
National Action Party (Mexico) politicians
21st-century Mexican politicians
Deputies of the LXII Legislature of Mexico
Members of the Chamber of Deputies (Mexico) for Tamaulipas